The Special Branch or SB (Malay: Cawangan Khas)  is an intelligence agency attached to the Royal Malaysia Police. The SB is empowered to acquire and develop intelligence on internal and external threats to the nation, subversive activities, extremist activities and activities of sabotage and spying. The SB has also been accused of carrying out unlawful enforced disappearances.

The SB is also empowered to analyse and advise on the necessary course of action to the various departments and agencies both within the Police Department and other related agencies. In the past, they have worked together in reforming the Thai Special Branch.

Background 
The SB was initially modelled after the Special Branch of the United Kingdom.

Activities

Communist insurgency (1948–1989)
During the Malayan Emergency, when the Malayan Communist Party (MCP) guerrillas were in open revolt, the Special Branch successfully infiltrated the party chain of command. Reportedly, one Special Branch officer managed to gain sufficient trust from the MCP to be ordered to infiltrate the Special Branch. He in turn managed to feed false information back to the MCP. It has also been claimed that the second-most high-ranking official in the MCP was a Special Branch agent, who was executed when he was discovered.

The Special Branch's activities during the Emergency were widely praised, garnering accolades such as one calling it "one of the finest establishments of its kind in the world". Other intelligence agencies sent observers to a Special Branch training centre in the Malayan capital of Kuala Lumpur to learn its tactics of infiltration and espionage. It was during this period that the British "Asianized" the Special Branch, replacing its crop of British spies and officers with trained locals.

Anwar Ibrahim scandal
In 1998, former Deputy Prime Minister Anwar Ibrahim was charged with sodomy and corruption, both crimes in Malaysia. During his trial, a number of statements were made by Special Branch officials, who had been implicated in the case.

One allegation made against Anwar was that he had ordered Special Branch officials to obtain retractions of the sodomy-related allegations against him. However, the Special Branch officials involved told the court that they had reason to believe the charges were fabricated by Anwar's political opponents. Two Special Branch men involved were its then Director, Mohamed Said bin Awang, and Second Deputy Director, Amir bin Junus. One witness at the trial testified that Mohamed Said had told Anwar to allow the Special Branch to look into the matter, instead of Anwar directing the Special Branch to cover it up.

During the trial, Mohamed Said shed light on the Special Branch's practices — mainly by explaining what was called a "turning-over operation", whereby retractions were obtained. At one point, he described it as a "great secret", and refused to elaborate beyond his explanation that "Basically we do a quick assessment on our target, then we see how the possibilities are to turn over their stand," and that "If it is a certain political stand, we may neutralize the stand if it is a security threat". Mohamed Said later responded to the question "If someone higher than the deputy prime minister were to instruct you to come and lie to the court here, would you do it?" with "Depends on the situation." After being pressed for a clarification by the judge, he said, "I may or I may not".

Raja Petra claims
Raja Petra Kamarudin, a former detainee under the Internal Security Act (ISA), has claimed that when he was brought in for questioning, he was astonished by how well-informed they were about his activities: "It was astonishing that they had been able to take all those photographs of me without me realising it. It began to make me wonder whether they had any other photographs of me and my wife in my bedroom doing.....well, you know. ... It was as if they had been present in the meeting room, had participated in the meeting, and had tape-recorded the entire session. We might as well just admit our crime and sign the confession..." He also claimed that the Special Branch had successfully infiltrated the hierarchy of several political parties in the country.

The arrest of Mas Selamat Kastari 
In February 2008, a major leader of the Singaporean Jemaah Islamiah (JI), Mas Selamat escaped from the Whitley Road Detention Center, a detention centre of the most stringent in Southeast Asia. A few months later, he was found hiding in a village house in Kampung Tawakal, Skudai, 40 km from the city of Johor Bahru.

With the surveillance and planning with tactical raids well planned, on 1 April 2009 06:00 AM  with the help from UTK counter-terrorist unit, the Special Branch managed to apprehend the leader of the militants in the home village. UTK outflank every corner of the house when Mas Selamat was sleeping.

According to witnesses the incident, Mohd Saat Marjo, 57, who was a neighbour next door told that a UTK armed with automatic weapons, along with members of the Special Branch in plain clothes, stormed the house through two gates which are broken as soon as Mas Selamat refused to come out to surrender even called by the police. He was handcuffed and his face was covered with dark blue cloth before being taken out. Regular members of JI, Abdul Matin Anol Rahmat and Johar Hassan were also arrested there. Police also seized a number of JI's documents and confidential planning information and sent Bomb Disposal Unit to ensure that the house was free of any explosives. However, the involvement of UTK in the operation was not made public because of the high level of secrecy. The arrest was credited to the Special Branch unit.

Abduction of Pastor Raymond Koh and Amri Che Mat 
In 2019, a national inquiry held by the Human Rights Commission of Malaysia's (SUHAKAM) concluded that agents of the Special Branch were responsible for the abduction of Amri Che Mat in 2016 and Raymond Koh in 2017.

See also
 Special Branch - Other Special Branch units in Britain and Commonwealth countries/territories

Notes and references

Further reading

External links
 Pro-democracy activist held in Malaysia during Myanmar president's visit
 Call for investigation into kidnapping of exiled Burmese journalist
 Abuse of Power Under the ISA
 Brutality in our own backyard
 Memorandum to SUHAKAM: Abuse of Section 18 of ISA in turning over detainees
 List of Royal Malaysian Police Force Address & Tel.
 "Cawangan Khas" on Royal Malaysia Police official website

Federal ministries, departments and agencies of Malaysia
Malaysian intelligence agencies
1948 establishments in Malaya
Government agencies established in 1948
Royal Malaysia Police